Myristica succadanea is a species of plant in the family Myristicaceae. It is a tree endemic to the Maluku Islands in Indonesia.

References

succadanea
Endemic flora of the Maluku Islands
Trees of the Maluku Islands
Near threatened plants
Taxa named by Caspar Georg Carl Reinwardt
Taxonomy articles created by Polbot